Government College Kattappana is an arts and science college functioning under the Department of Collegiate Education, Government of Kerala. The college is affiliated to Mahatma Gandhi University, Kerala. The college is recognized under the 2(f) and 12(B) schedules of the UGC act. It offers various undergraduate and postgraduate programmes through which about seven hundred students fulfil their higher education aspirations. The college was accredited with an  'A' grade by the National Assessment and Accreditation Council (NAAC) in September 2016.

History
Government college, Kattappana was established in July 1977 to fulfill a long need in the vicinity. Prof.R.Balakrishnan Nair took charge as the first principal of the college on 26 July 1977. The affiliation was granted by the University of Kerala for starting a Junior college. The classes started on 18 August 1977.  The University of Kerala accorded sanction for starting a unit of NSS during the academic year 1979–1980. The college was later upgraded in the year 1989 for Undergraduate Studies in Economics.
The permanent affiliation for the college was granted by the Mahathma Gandhi University, Kottayam in the year 1994.

Campus
The college is located in the spice city of Kerala,  Kattappana. The institute is equipped  with all modern amenities.  The main building consists of an academic block and administrative office. The newly built science block is a three storeyed one with modular laboratory and instrumentation facilities. The college does have a state of art library block with around 420000 books and e facilities. The postgraduate and research department of Malayalam functions in a separate academic block. The college does have hostels for both boys and girls inside the campus. The college does also have a staff quarters with the facilities for 12 families.   It is situated on a beautiful windy hill which is just 1.5 km. away from the Kattappana main town.

Co-curricular activities of the college come under various clubs. They are NSS, NCC, tourism club, women cell,Career Guidance and counseling cell, arts club, debate club, quiz club and nature clubs.

Organisation and administration

Departments
The institute has 13 departments. Courses are offered and managed independently by these departments. They are
 Physical Education

Facilities
Various facilities available in the institute are
 Library
 Edusat Bhavan
 Internet Bhavan
 Wifi connectivity 
 Computer lab for Commerce & Maths Dept.
 Conference hall
 Auditorium
 Sports grounds
 Boys Hostel
 Girls Hostel
 Staff Quarters
 E learning Centre
 College Bus
 Reading corner

Courses offered

Different courses offered at the institute are

Image gallery

References

External links

 
 gck.co.in
 gckattappana.nic.in

Arts and Science colleges in Kerala
Colleges affiliated to Mahatma Gandhi University, Kerala
Universities and colleges in Idukki district
Educational institutions established in 1977
1977 establishments in Kerala